Ben Matthew Edmondson (born 28 September 1978 in Southport, Queensland) is an Australian cricketer who has played for the Western Warriors, Southern Redbacks and Gloucestershire. He is a right-arm fast-medium bowler.

After struggling to get a game for Queensland due to the long fast-bowling queue, Edmondson was invited to Western Australia. He made his Pura Cup debut for the Warriors after just five days from his arrival. He finished the season with 28 wickets at an average of 31.61. He was one of the heroes against his former state in a thrilling ING Cup final victory.

The next summer he was the state's leading wicket taker with 29 victims in seven games. He was rewarded with selection in the Prime Minister's XI. In 2005–06 he demonstrated great consistency by again topping 20 wickets with 24 at 33.79. Edmondson has career best figures of 6/28.

In 2003 he represented Denmark in a one-day game against Wales.

He moved to the Southern Redbacks for the 2010–11 season, and represented Glenelg in the local competition in Adelaide. Edmondson's season at the Redbacks was a success, taking the most wickets in the domestic one-day competition, and he retired in March 2011.

In July 2011 he was signed by the new Perth Scorchers team for the 2011–12 Big Bash Twenty20 league.

References

External links

1978 births
Australian cricketers
Living people
Western Australia cricketers
Denmark cricketers
South Australia cricketers
Gloucestershire cricketers
Perth Scorchers cricketers
Sportspeople from the Gold Coast, Queensland
Cricketers from Queensland
Rajshahi Royals cricketers
Australian people of Danish descent